Science On a Sphere (SOS) is a spherical projection system created by the United States National Oceanic and Atmospheric Administration (NOAA). It presents high-resolution video on a suspended globe rather than a flat screen, with the aim of better representing global phenomena. Animated images of atmospheric storms, climate change, and ocean temperature can be shown on the sphere to explain these complex environmental processes. SOS systems are most frequently installed in science museums, universities, zoos, and research institutions, although new and novel uses for these systems in a variety of presentation spaces and contexts are starting to emerge.

The system has been installed in more than 130 locations worldwide.

History
SOS was invented by Alexander E. MacDonald, the former director of the Earth System Research Laboratory. MacDonald devised the original idea for SOS in 1995. A team of NOAA staff wrote the SOS software and developed the SOS hardware and system architecture. This work enabled MacDonald's invention to move out from the laboratory. A patent was awarded to NOAA for Science On a Sphere in August 2005.

Configuration
SOS uses many off-the-shelf hardware and software components. A spherical screen covered in ordinary latex paint hangs suspended in the center of a projection space. The screen is inert; it neither moves nor has any electronic parts. Surrounding the screen are four video projectors, positioned around the screen. Each projector is responsible for one quadrant of screen space. One CPU is used to control the system. The SOS software runs on Linux.

The sphere
Other sphere sizes are possible. The 68" sphere with a single seam at the equator weighs under . The sphere is attached to the ceiling or suspension structure with a three-point suspension system to hold the sphere in place and reduce lateral movement and blurring.

Projectors
The system requires high quality, bright, long duty cycle projectors generally permanently installed in board rooms and high end home theaters rather than smaller portable and consumer models to endure the requirements of 8–10 hours per day, 7 days per week of most public displays.

Computer hardware
The computer hardware used for SOS is constantly evolving based on what is available on the market.  The newest configuration uses one Ubuntu Linux computer with NVIDIA Quadro graphics cards, and an iPad app to control the Science On a Sphere.  Previous versions used five Red Hat Linux computers.

SOS data details

The majority of SOS assets are so-called "datasets". Originally conceived as a video system for showing space based collections of Earth data, SOS has grown in its utility. The majority of data that traditionally appears on the SOS screens concerns the Earth, either from near-real-time data acquisition systems, or from processed remote sensing platforms. But recent interest and growth in different kinds of media have started to broaden that library.  There are currently over 500 datasets that can be shown on the sphere, including real-time infrared satellite images, Mars, real-time Earthquakes, an ocean acidification model, and others, including a number of movies.

The data format for SOS datasets is the equirectangular projection, as shown by the map to the right.

SOS User's Collaborative Network
NOAA supports the use of spherical display systems, such as SOS, in public exhibits as part of a focused effort to increase environmental literacy. The institutions that currently have NOAA's Science On a Sphere, as well as other partners who are creating content and educational programming for these systems, have formed a collaborative network. The SOS Users Collaborative Network is supported by NOAA's Office of Education (OEd) and the NOAA Earth System Research Laboratory (ESRL) to provide a mechanism for these institutions to work together to maximize the effectiveness of the SOS system as an Earth system science education platform.

Locations
Science On a Sphere is installed in science museums, zoos and aquariums, and visitors centers around the world.  New sites are continually being added.

See also
Virtual globe

References

External links

 BWC Visual Technology A distributor and installer of Science on a Sphere

SOS Explorer, the desktop version of SOS for Windows and Mac computers, was released in September 2015 and is free for classroom or personal use.

Display technology
Office of Oceanic and Atmospheric Research
Science and technology in the United States
Spheres